HS9, HS-9, or HS.9 may refer to:

 HS9, in the HS postcode area, a postcode district in the Outer Hebrides, Scotland, United Kingdom
 HS9, the rocket used for the Hypersonic Flight Experiment
 Helicopter Anti-Submarine Squadron 9 (HS-9), the designation of two Helicopter Antisubmarine Warfare Squadrons of the United States Navy
 Hirtenberg HS.9, an Austrian two-seat touring aircraft
 Hispano-Suiza HS.9, a 20mm autocannon
 Hongqi E-HS9, a Chinese electric full-size SUV